Capo is the fifth studio album  by American hip hop recording artist Jim Jones. It was released April 5, 2011, by E1 Music.

Critical reception

The New York Times called the album chaotic, but often successful in spite of itself. They called his rhymes nimble but cluttered and said he is out-rapped by almost all of his guests here, including Game on "Carton of Milk" and Lloyd Banks on "Take a Bow". They also stated his standout tracks are the lead single, "Perfect Day" and  the Wiz Khalifa-esque "Heart Attack" stating that he is so at ease, so comfortable on those tracks, that he begins to sound skillful. John Kennedy of Vibe gave a fairly positive review calling the utopian "Perfect Day" catchy and saying vulnerable moments ("Changing the Locks" and "Heart Attack") round the album out, while hometown collabos ("Take A Bow" with Prodigy, Lloyd Banks, Sen City and "Drops Is Out" with Raekwon, Mel Matrix, Sen City) fly highest.

Commercial performance
The album debuted at number 20 on the Billboard 200, selling 21,000 copies in its first week. In its second week, the album sold 8,200 copies.

Track listing

Charts

Weekly charts

Year-end charts

References

2011 albums
Jim Jones (rapper) albums
E1 Music albums
Albums produced by Chink Santana
Albums produced by Drumma Boy
Albums produced by AraabMuzik
Albums produced by Lex Luger